Call signs in United Kingdom include a three letter country code, and a series of letters and numbers.

Call signs are regulated internationally by the ITU as well as nationally in the UK by the Office of Communications (Ofcom). It regulates amateur radio in the country as an independent regulator and competition authority for the UK communications industries, with responsibilities across television, radio, telecommunications and wireless communications services.  It assigns call signs, issues amateur radio licences, allots frequency spectrum, and monitors the radio waves. Ofcom is no longer responsible for setting and conducting amateur radio exams, which are now run by the Radio Society of Great Britain on their behalf.

The Radio Society of Great Britain (RSGB) is the United Kingdom's recognised national society for amateur radio operators. The society's former patron was Prince Philip, Duke of Edinburgh, and it represents the interests of the UK's licensed radio amateurs.

Call sign blocks for telecommunication
The International Telecommunication Union has assigned Great Britain the following call sign blocks for all radio communication, broadcasting or transmission:

While not directly related to call signs, the International Telecommunication Union (ITU) further has divided all countries assigned amateur radio prefixes into three regions; Great Britain is located in ITU Region 1.

Assignments
These are callsigns of BBC Regional transmitters in the years prior to World War II.

Call sign assignments for amateur radio

Amateur radio or ham radio call signs are unique identifiers for the 75,000 licensed operators. Ofcom allots the individual call signs to the amateurs it licences.  Call signs are the property of Ofcom even when assigned.

Callsigns in the G9 series are commercial licences, issued for experimental purposes and these may not be used on the amateur bands (except in the case of a contest callsign).

Regional two-letter prefixes are assigned according to the following table:

Overseas call sign assignments

Special event call signs
Ofcom reserves the right to issue temporary special event call signs to licensed amateurs holding a full licence.

Special event call signs are issued with a 'GB' prefix, but others like GQ, GO, GR, MQ, GA, MO, and 2O have been issued in special cases. Ofcom also allows numerals in special event call sign suffixes. For instance GB75RD was a special event sign for the 75th anniversary of the Reading and District Amateur radio club. More recently Ofcom have agreed to what was a very special arrangement for the use of the Special Event Station call sign G100RSGB during 2013 to mark the 100th anniversary of the RSGB (where "" is replaced by the secondary location identifier, M, W, I, D, U, and J, etc. (but never with B) to form the typical 'GB' prefix for other special events.)

Exceptionally, call signs taking the form 'GB3xx' are usually allocated to repeaters whilst beacons usually take the 'GB3xxx' form.

The GR prefix has now been allocated, as of 2017, as a special event prefix alongside "GB", as the callsign GR2HQ has been in use under a Notice of Variation (NoV) since 2011. The prefix GR has now been allocated in the special event callsign range rather than an NoV. For reference, GR2HQ is the UK multiplier station in the Headquarters section (country-on-country national societies head-to-head section) of the annual IARU HF Championship Contest.

To celebrate the wedding of HRH Prince Harry and Miss Meghan Markle, the RSGB agreed with Ofcom an NoV to authorise the temporary use of the Regional Secondary Locator 'R' after the United Kingdom call sign prefix. Successful applicants were able to use the modifier between 19–21 May 2018.

Reciprocal agreements
Holders of licences in countries signed up to  operate with their home call sign prefixed with an M/ plus the additional country identifier when necessary (e.g. MM, MI, MW etc.). Holders of licences in countries signed up to  can operate for 3 months before needing a Great Britain call sign as issued by Ofcom.

See also
 Radio Society of Great Britain
 ITU prefix – amateur and experimental stations
 Amateur radio license

References

External links
 Radio Society of Great Britain
 Ofcom

United Kingdom
Communications in the United Kingdom
Mass media in the United Kingdom